"Stone Into the River" is a song by Dutch singer-songwriter Douwe Bob and Ardesko. The song was released in the Netherlands on 19 December 2013 as a digital download. The song was released as the third single from his debut studio album Born In a Storm (2013). The song peaked to number 78 on the Dutch Singles Chart.

Track listing

Chart performance

Weekly charts

Release history

References

2013 singles
2013 songs
Douwe Bob songs